Crimson Cow is a German video game publisher that was founded in 2002. They hold the German license for the Runaway series and the worldwide publishing rights for A Vampyre Story.

References

External links
Official Crimson Cow website

German companies established in 2002
Video game companies established in 2002
Video game development companies
Video game companies of Germany
Video game publishers